The Arkansas–Texas Tech football rivalry is a college football rivalry game between the Razorbacks of the University of Arkansas and the Red Raiders of Texas Tech University.

History
The two schools first met in 1957, with Arkansas defeating Texas Tech by a score of 47–26 in Little Rock, Arkansas. Arkansas won the first nine games in the rivalry before Texas Tech broke through with a 21–16 victory in 1966. The Red Raiders also defeated the Razorbacks the following year, winning 31–27. After a 30–7 Texas Tech victory in 1976, Arkansas embarked on another nine-game winning streak, winning every year until 1986. Arkansas and Texas Tech played every year from 1957–1991, when the teams were members of the Southwest Conference. In 1992, Arkansas joined the Southeastern Conference, and the two schools have only played twice since: a 49–28 Arkansas victory in 2014 and a 35–24 Texas Tech victory in 2015. The teams are scheduled to meet in a home-and-home series for 2030 and 2031.

Game results

See also 
 List of NCAA college football rivalry games

References

College football rivalries in the United States
Arkansas Razorbacks football
Texas Tech Red Raiders football